Biron is a toponymic surname that is derived from either one of several places in France, or, as a variant spelling of Byron, from Byram, North Yorkshire. Notable people with the surname include:

 Armand de Gontaut, baron de Biron (1524–1592), celebrated French soldier
 Charles de Gontaut, duc de Biron (1562–1602), French marshal, son of Armand de Biron
 Ernst Johann von Biron (1690–1772), Russian regent (1740), sovereign Duke of Courland (1737–40, 1763–69)
 Gustav von Biron (1700–1746), brother of Ernst Johann, first active service commander of the Izmaylovsky Regiment (1734–1740)
 Peter von Biron (1724–1800), sovereign Duke of Courland (1769–95), son of Ernst Johann von Biron
 Armand Louis de Gontaut (1747–1793), known as Biron, soldier and politician
 Henry Biron (1835–1915), English clergyman and cricketer
 Martin Biron (born 1977), NHL goalie
 Mathieu Biron (born 1980), ice hockey defenceman, brother of Martin Biron

See also 
 
 
 Biram (disambiguation), a variant spelling
 Byram (surname), a variant spelling
 Byrom, a variant spelling
 Byrum (surname), a variant spelling

References 

English toponymic surnames
Surnames of French origin